Federigo is a given name. Notable people with the name include:

Federigo Argentieri (born 1953), Italian scholar and academic
Federigo Enriques (1871–1946), Italian mathematician
Federigo Fregoso (1480–1541), Italian nobleman, prelate and general
Federigo Giambelli, Italian military engineer in the 16th century
Federigo Tozzi (1883–1920), Italian writer

Italian masculine given names